Proprotein convertase subtilisin/kexin type 7 is an enzyme that in humans is encoded by the PCSK7 gene.

The protein encoded by this gene belongs to the subtilisin-like proprotein convertase family. The members of this family are proprotein convertases that process latent precursor proteins into their biologically active products. This encoded protein is a calcium-dependent serine endoprotease. It is structurally related to its family members, PACE and PACE4. This protein is concentrated in the trans-Golgi network, associated with the membranes, and is not secreted. It can process proalbumin and is thought to be responsible for the activation of HIV envelope glycoproteins gp160 and gp140. 

This gene has been implicated in the transcriptional regulation of housekeeping genes. Multiple alternatively spliced transcripts are described for this gene but their full length nature is not yet known. Downstream of this gene's map location at 11q23-q24, nucleotides that match part of this gene's 3' end are duplicated and inverted. A translocation breakpoint associated with lymphoma occurs between this gene and its inverted counterpart.

References

Further reading